Littleton and Badsey railway station was a station on the Great Western Railway's Oxford, Worcester and Wolverhampton line, near the town of Evesham, Worcestershire in England. It served the villages of Badsey, South Littleton, Middle Littleton and North Littleton.

The station was opened by the Oxford, Worcester and Wolverhampton Railway on 21 April 1884 The 1963 report The Reshaping of British Railways listed the station for closure, and British Railways closed the station on 3 January 1966.

Littleton and Badsey was one of the stations Flanders and Swann mentioned in song Slow Train, which was written in response to The Reshaping of British Railways and released in 1963.

References

External links
Littleton and Badsey Station on navigable 1946 O.S. map
 Littleton and Badsey station

Disused railway stations in Worcestershire
Former Great Western Railway stations
Railway stations in Great Britain opened in 1884
Railway stations in Great Britain closed in 1966
Beeching closures in England